John Jones Greenwood (1921–1994) was a footballer who played as a wing half in the Football League for Manchester City, Exeter City and Aldershot.

References

External links

Manchester City F.C. players
1994 deaths
1921 births
Exeter City F.C. players
Aldershot F.C. players
Association football wing halves
Halifax Town A.F.C. players
Footballers from Manchester
English footballers
English Football League players